Ennio Massari Filonardi (died 1565) was a Roman Catholic prelate who served as Bishop of Montefeltro (1549–1565).

Biography
On 29 April 1549, Ennio Massari Filonardi was appointed during the papacy of Pope Paul III as Bishop of Montefeltro succeeding his uncle, Cardinal Ennio Filonardi.
He served as Bishop of Montefeltro until his death in 1565.

References

External links and additional sources
 (for Chronology of Bishops) 
 (for Chronology of Bishops) 

16th-century Italian Roman Catholic bishops
Bishops appointed by Pope Paul III
1565 deaths